Carbonia may refer to:

Places
Italy
 Carbonia, Sardinia, a comune in the Province of South Sardinia

Other uses
 Amorphous carbonia, a synthetically produced carbon dioxide glass
 Carbonia (crustacean), an old synonym for Carbonita, a crustacean from the Carboniferous period